Nils Daniel Granfelt (February 17, 1887 – July 21, 1959) was a Swedish gymnast who competed in the 1912 Summer Olympics. He was part of the Swedish team, which won the gold medal in the gymnastics men's team, Swedish system event.

References

External links
Profile at databaseOlympics.com

1887 births
1959 deaths
Swedish male artistic gymnasts
Gymnasts at the 1912 Summer Olympics
Olympic gymnasts of Sweden
Olympic gold medalists for Sweden
Olympic medalists in gymnastics
Medalists at the 1912 Summer Olympics
19th-century Swedish people
20th-century Swedish people